The Madison Cash Spiel (formerly the Laphroaig Curling Championship, the Laphroaig Scotch Open, The Korbel Championship and the Morgan Stanley Curling Classic) was an annual bonspiel, or curling tournament, that took place at the Madison Curling Club in Madison, Wisconsin. The tournament was held in a round-robin format. The men's tournament, started in 2003 as part of the World Curling Tour, was held every year since its inception until 2013. The women's tournament began in 2011. The tournament was part of the Great Lakes Curling Tour.

Past champions
Only skip's name is displayed.

Men

Women

References

External links
Madison Curling Club Home

Former World Curling Tour events
Sports in Madison, Wisconsin
Curling competitions in the United States
Curling in Wisconsin